Lists of medical abbreviations109